Semantic analysis or context sensitive analysis is a process in compiler construction, usually after parsing, to gather necessary semantic information from the source code. It usually includes type checking, or makes sure a variable is declared before use which is impossible to describe in the extended Backus–Naur form and thus not easily detected during parsing.

See also 
 Attribute grammar
 Context-sensitive language
 Semantic analysis (computer science)

References

Compiler construction
Program analysis